Weaver Street Market is a worker- and consumer-owned cooperative selling natural and organic food with a focus on local and fair trade products.  The original market is situated in the heart of Carrboro, North Carolina in Carr Mill Mall and plays host to many community events. It occupies a central location in the town of Carrboro and serves as a "community gathering place."

It had expanded to include a restaurant named Panzanella in Carr Mill Mall and two additional locations, one at Southern Village in Chapel Hill and another in historic downtown Hillsborough, North Carolina.  In late December 2013, Panzanella officially ceased business operations.
Weaver Street Market plans to open a fourth store in downtown Raleigh at the dillion in 2019. Construction is already  under way and the store is set to open early Spring 2019.

History
The market was started with a loan from the town of Carrboro.

During the course of 2006, some local residents expressed annoyance at new rules stating that all performances on the market lawn must have signed permission in advance from the owners of Carr Mill Mall. The lawn area consistently holds events and entertainment.

In May 2007, plans were announced to open a third store in Hillsborough, North Carolina and move the market's food preparation operations to Hillsborough for greater efficiency. Even though the plans were announced in May 2007, plans and employee feedback were included in the decision-making process since 2006. About 100 workers presented a petition in opposition to the plan outlining their concerns that WSM was growing too large.

Plans have been made in other locales to copy the success of Weaver Street Market; one example is in Boynton Beach, Florida.

References

External links
 Weaver Street Market website
 Weaver Street Market: A Home-Grown Success Story

Companies based in Chapel Hill-Carrboro, North Carolina
Organic food retail organizations
Supermarkets of the United States
Cooperatives in the United States